Bushnell is a city in western Florida and is the county seat of Sumter County, Florida, United States. The population was 2,418 at the 2010 census. According to the U.S. Census estimates of 2018, the city had a population of 3,119.

History
A post office called Bushnell has been in operation since 1885. The City of Bushnell was named after John W. Bushnell, who was responsible for bringing the railroad to the community. The City of Bushnell is also home to Dade Battlefield state park, a park where on December 28th, 1835, Indians ambushed 107 men in the forested area. Only 3 survivors came out of Dade Battlefield, and the battle signaled the beginning of the Second Seminole War.

Geography
Bushnell is located in west-central Sumter County. The area around Bushnell is relatively flat, with some forested areas belonging to the state and rivers, creeks, and small streams that flow underneath roadways with bridges.

Transportation
The main roads through Bushnell include US 301 which runs north and south through the city. County Road 48 (SR 48 until 2016) and County Road 476 run east and west, and have short concurrency with US 301, as well as each other.

Interstate 75 runs along the western edge of Bushnell with Exit 314 leading to Sumter CR 314. County Road 475 begins at CR 48 and runs the CSX Wildwood Subdivision, which carried Amtrak's Palmetto until 2004. The Wildwood Subdivision runs along US 301 from north of the Hernando-Sumter County Line, to Bushnell until Route 301 turns onto East Noble Avenue. From there it runs along the east side of CR 48 until that route turns west onto West Belt Avenue, then follows the east side of CR 475 until its terminus at Exit 321 on I-75 at CR 470 in Lake Panasoffkee.

Bushnell also runs a small transit bus, that follows a daily route around the city's main attractions and busiest areas.

Demographics

At the 2000 census there were 2,050 people in 830 households, including 538 families, in the city. The population density was 871.7 inhabitants per square mile (336.8/km). The racial makeup of the city was 83.37% White, 12.98% African American, 0.34% Native American, 0.73% Asian, 1.27% from other races, and 1.32% from two or more races. Hispanic or Latino of any race were 3.56%.

Of the 830 households 25.4% had children under the age of 18 living with them, 49.4% were married couples living together, 12.4% had a female householder with no husband present, and 35.1% were non-families. 31.2% of households were one person and 17.7% were one person aged 65 or older. The average household size was 2.25 and the average family size was 2.79.

The age distribution was 20.6% under the age of 18, 8.8% from 18 to 24, 23.3% from 25 to 44, 21.5% from 45 to 64, and 25.8% 65 or older. The median age was 43 years. For every 100 females, there were 90.2 males. For every 100 females age 18 and over, there were 85.4 males.

The median household income was $26,676 and the median family income  was $34,063. Males had a median income of $27,986 versus $23,125 for females. The per capita income for the city was $14,737. About 11.0% of families and 14.7% of the population were below the poverty line, including 17.5% of those under age 18 and 13.4% of those age 65 or over.

Government and infrastructure
Sumter County operates Bushnell Annex in Room 201 at 910 North Main Street.

Sumter District Schools headquarters and South Sumter High School are located in Bushnell.

References

External links

Bushnell City Website
Bushnell History (Sumter Today)

Cities in Sumter County, Florida
County seats in Florida
Cities in Florida
1885 establishments in Florida
Populated places established in 1885